Amidžić is a Bosnian Serbian surname. Its literal meaning of "descendant of the amca (paternal uncle)" is similar to that of the Turkish family name Amcaoğlu. Notable people with the name include:

 Zoran Amidžić (born 1964), former Serbian footballer

References

Bosnian surnames
Serbian surnames
Patronymic surnames